Iliev, feminine Ilieva is a Bulgarian surname derived from the personal name Iliya and may refer to:

Borislav Iliev (born 1988), Bulgarian footballer
Boyan Iliev (born 1982), Bulgarian footballer
Dejan Iliev (born 1995), Macedonian footballer
Dimitar Iliev (footballer born 1986), Bulgarian footballer
Dimitar Iliev (footballer born 1988), Bulgarian footballer
Dimitar Iliev Popov (born 1927), leading Bulgarian judge and Prime Minister of Bulgaria
 Georgi Iliev (businessman) (1966–2005), Bulgarian businessman
 Georgi Iliev (footballer, born 1981), Bulgarian footballer
 Georgi Iliev (footballer, born 1956), Bulgarian footballer and manager
 Georgi Iliev (ice hockey) (born 1948), Bulgarian ice hockey player
Hristo Iliev (volleyball) (born 1951), Bulgarian former volleyball player
Ilian Iliev (born 1968), Bulgarian footballer and manager
Iliya Iliev (born 1974), Bulgarian footballer
Iliyan Iliev, Bulgarian footballer
Ivan Iliev (disambiguation), several people
Ivelina Ilieva, Bulgarian judoka
Ivica Iliev (born 1979), Serbian footballer
Katya Ilieva, Bulgarian athlete
Maria Ilieva, Bulgarian singer
Marieta Ilieva, Bulgarian gymnast
Nikolay Iliev (born 1964), Bulgarian footballer
Peter Iliev (born 1984), Bulgarian luger who has competed since 2000
Plamen Iliev (disambiguation), several people
Sachko Iliev, Bulgarian sprint canoeist who competed in the late 1960s and early 1970s
Stefan Iliev, Bulgarian sprint canoeist who competed in the 1970s
Strati Iliev (born 1974), Bulgarian footballer
Tsvetan Iliev (born 1990), Bulgarian footballer
Tsvetanka Ilieva, Bulgarian athlete
Valentin Iliev (born 1980), Bulgarian footballer
Valentina Ilieva, Bulgarian volleyball player
Vasil Iliev, Bulgarian mobster, businessman and wrestler
Vaska Ilieva, Macedonian folk singer
Zdravko Iliev (born 1984), Bulgarian footballer
Zhaneta Ilieva, Bulgarian gymnast

See also
Iliev Glacier, the 5 km long and 1.5 km wide glacier in Lassus Mountains on Alexander Island, Antarctica
Aliyev

Bulgarian-language surnames
Patronymic surnames
Surnames from given names